Gopal Poddar (born 6 April 1951) is an Indian businessman & founder of Limtex group of companies. Poddar started Limtex in 1977 as a small tea business at the very beginning. He is serving as Chairman cum Managing Director of Limtex group till date.

Early life and education
Born on West Bengal, India on 6 April 1951, Poddar graduated with a degree in commerce from the University of Calcutta. Afterwards he received an LLB from University Law College Calcutta, along with a post graduate degree in commerce.

Career 
Poddar started his career as an Officer in Hindustan Development Corporation, where he served for nine years at various functional & administrative position. He started off independently on the year 1977 as a small tea trading business at turnover of 1.02 lacks, which has now diversified into various businesses from tea export to information technology under Limtex group of industries & have turnover of 200 crores for the fiscal end March 2002. He heads as chairman & MD of Limtex group for last 35 years. He also holds a diplomatic position as Hon. Counsel General, representing Peru.

Achievements 
In 1999, Limtex was awarded the National Export award. Then Niryaat Shree Award from the Ministry of Commerce and the Federation of Indian Export Organization.

Businesspeople from Kolkata
1951 births
Living people
University of Calcutta alumni